The Hosselkus Limestone is an Upper Triassic fossiliferous marine micritic limestone formation that outcrops in Plumas and Shasta Counties, California. It is known for its invertebrate fauna, most notably the many species of shelled cephalopods.

Geology

The geologic column of the nearby Taylorsville region shows the Hosselkus Limestone as 140 ft thick and of Late Triassic (early Karnian) age. It is well exposed near the Cosmopolitan mine on the divide between the Genesee Valley and Hosselkus Creek. It has been recognized at numerous outcrops between Spanish Ranch and Prattville and northwestward beyond Pit River in the Klamath Mountains, and is considered to be younger than the Swearinger slates and older than the Trail beds. It contains numerous Arcestes and abundant pentagonal crinoid stems which indicate it is of Late Triassic age.

Paleofauna
Over 208 described species of invertebrates have been found in the Hosselkus Limestone and nearby Brock Mountain. These species include shellfish, nautilus, snails, and ammonites. Many of these species can be also found in the Mediterranean region, which shows a much closer connection between the American and Mediterranean regions. The Great Basin sea was then the western end of the ancient Tethys, of which the Indian sea was the eastern limit.

A noteworthy feature of this fauna is the abundance of Trachyceras in the area, as in the Mediterranean that genus had dissipated before the advent of the Tropites fauna. This area is rather sharply separated into two faunal subzones. The lower, the Trachyceras subzone, carries an abundance of Trachyceras, Tropites,  Paratropites, and Clionites. The upper subzone carries a few survivors of the  Tropites group, Juvavites, Gonionotites, Metasibrites, and  Arcestes.  Discotropites,  Sagenites, and the nautiloids occur in nearly equal numbers in the two subzones.

Vertebrates

Invertebrates

Plants and Fungi

References

External links
  318 pp.

Triassic California
Geologic formations of the United States
Triassic System of North America
Natural history of California